Evening Bell is a 1988 Chinese war film directed by Wu Ziniu. The film stars Tao Zeru, Chong Peipei, and others, and was produced in part by the August First Film Studio, a production company associated with the People's Liberation Army.

It was one of three war films Wu directed in 1988, the other two being Joyous Heroes, and its sequel Between Life and Death.

Plot 
Taking place in the immediate aftermath of the Second Sino-Japanese War (the Chinese branch of the Second World War), Evening Bell follows a small platoon of five Chinese soldiers who must negotiate a devastated landscape, burying bodies, disarming mines, and eventually facing off against a starving band of Japanese soldiers who do not yet know that the war has ended.

Censorship and reception 
Evening Bell went through a rigorous four-part process with Chinese censors. While the final result was much changed from Wu's original vision, the film nevertheless did well critically both home and abroad. The film won Wu a Golden Rooster award for best direction in 1989 as well as a Silver Bear - Special Jury Prize at the 39th Berlin International Film Festival.

References

External links 

Evening Bell at the Chinese Movie Database

1988 films
Chinese war drama films
Second Sino-Japanese War films
Mandarin-language films
Films directed by Wu Ziniu
Silver Bear Grand Jury Prize winners